Madagascarchaea gracilicollis is a member of the family Archaeidae, assassin spiders. It is merely 2 mm long and catches other spiders with venomous fangs at the end of its hugely elongated jaws (chelicerae).

These animals normally run upside down.

Etymology
From  Latin gracilis "slender" and collum "neck".

Distribution
This species is endemic to Madagascar.

References

External links
 Picture of E. gracilicollis
 Article with a picture

Archaeidae
Spiders of Madagascar
Endemic fauna of Madagascar
Spiders described in 1948